Ebubennem Megalyn Ann Echikunwoke  (born May 28, 1983), also known as Megalyn E.K., is an American actress, known primarily for her roles in television and film.

Born in Spokane, Washington, she was discovered while performing in a theatrical production for an arts academy, and began working professionally at age 15, appearing in an episode of The Steve Harvey Show. Between 2001 and 2002, she starred as Nicole Palmer, daughter of David Palmer, on the Fox series 24, followed by guest roles on ER and Buffy the Vampire Slayer. Between 2004 and 2005, she portrayed Angie Barnett, the half-sister of Steven Hyde, on the sitcom That '70s Show. In 2006, she starred as a lead in the series The 4400 which ran until 2007, followed by recurring roles on 90210 and House of Lies.

Her film roles in the early 2010s include Whit Stillman's Damsels in Distress (2011), and the action sequel A Good Day to Die Hard (2013). In 2016, she portrayed Mari McCabe / Vixen in the Arrowverse. The following year, she had a supporting role in CHiPs (2017), followed by the independent comedy An Actor Prepares (2018). Next, she co-starred in the comedy Night School (2018). In late 2018, she made her New York stage debut in an off-Broadway production of Apologia.

Early life
Ebubennem Megalyn Ann Echikunwoke was born in Spokane, Washington to Mark Onigwe Versato Echikunwoke, an Igbo Nigerian father, and Anita Laurie. Her father, an immigrant to the United States, was a survivor of the Nigerian Civil War, during which he suffered gunshot wounds that resulted in him contracting hepatitis B.

When Echikunwoke was four years old, her father, then attending law school in Spokane, died of liver cancer, stemming from his war-related medical problems. Her mother moved the family to the Navajo Nation, where she raised Echikunwoke and her siblings in the unincorporated community of Chinle, Arizona. At age 14, Echikunwoke was discovered while performing in a theater production at an arts academy summer camp.

Career

Echikunwoke's first featured role was a guest appearance on The Steve Harvey Show in 1998. The following year, she had her first film role in Julie Dash's Funny Valentines. In 2001, she starred in a lead role on the MTV soap opera Spyder Games as Cherish Pardee, a coffee house singer, which ran through the year. She subsequently had a recurring role in the first season of 24 (2001–2002) as David Palmer's daughter Nicole. Beginning 2003, she appeared as Danika on the comedy series Like Family, and guest-starred on Buffy the Vampire Slayer, in the episode "The Killer in Me" (2003). This was followed with a guest role on Veronica Mars in 2004.

Between 2004 and 2005, she appeared on Fox's That '70s Show as Steven Hyde's half-sister, Angie Barnett. In 2006, she was cast as a series regular on the science fiction television series The 4400 as the adult version of the mysterious Isabelle Tyler. She left the show in 2007. From 2008 to 2009, she appeared in season 7 of CSI: Miami as new medical examiner Dr. Tara Price. She had a recurring role on TNT's Raising the Bar (2008–2009) as the love interest of attorney Marcus McGrath, played by J. August Richards. Also in 2008, she appeared as a singer in the Leonard Chess biopic Who Do You Love? In 2011, she played Holly in the fourth season of 90210, and subsequently appeared in the comedy film Damsels in Distress.

She played April on Showtime's House of Lies (2012) and Riley Parker in the legal drama Made in Jersey (also 2012) on CBS. In 2014, she co-starred in the drama series Mind Games on ABC.

In 2016, Echikunwoke appeared on the CW's Arrow as DC Comics superhero Mari McCabe / Vixen for an episode, and voiced the character in the CW Seed animated series Vixen. Due to prior commitments, she was unavailable to play the character in Legends of Tomorrow, resulting in the introduction of a new Vixen played by Maisie Richardson-Sellers, the time-displaced grandmother of Echikunwoke's character. Echikunwoke had a supporting role in Dax Shepard's CHiPs (2017), followed by the comedy An Actor Prepares (2018). That year, she had a supporting role in the comedy Night School, which grossed over $100million.

She played Claire in the off-Broadway production of Apologia for the Roundabout Theatre Company which ran from October 16, 2018, to December 16, 2018. In 2019, she had a supporting role in Late Night. She subsequently had a main role on Almost Family, a Fox drama series chronicling three women who learn they are siblings after a prominent fertility doctor reveals he has used his own sperm to father over 100 children with his patients. It was cancelled after one season.

Personal life 
In 2007, Echikunwoke, Justin Long, Olivia Wilde and Kal Penn campaigned for 2008 Democratic Presidential nominee Barack Obama. It included a winter tour of college campuses and bars in Iowa, known as the All-Actor All-Iowa All-Star Voter Education Tour, to register new college-age voters prior to the election. 

Echikunwoke's cousin is athlete Annette Echikunwoke.

Filmography

Film

Television

Web

Video games

Stage credits

References

External links 
 

 

1983 births
Actresses from Arizona
20th-century American actresses
21st-century American actresses
African-American actresses
American people of Igbo descent
American film actresses
American stage actresses
American television actresses
American voice actresses
Living people
Actresses from Spokane, Washington
People from Chinle, Arizona
20th-century African-American women
20th-century African-American people
21st-century African-American women
21st-century African-American people
Igbo actresses